Bouba Njida National Park is a national park of Cameroon. A total of 23 antelope species occur in the park. The painted hunting dog, Lycaon pictus, had been observed in Bouba Njida National Park at the start of the 21st century. This population of the endangered canid is one of the few that remained in Cameroon as of the year 2000.

In 2012, heavily armed poachers from Chad and Sudan massacred some 200 savannah elephants while on horseback thus wiping out more than half of the elephant population of the Bouba N’Djida National Park.

Background
Bouba Njida National Park covers an area of 220,000 hectares (540,000 acres). Initially it was established as a reserve in 1932. It was upgraded to level of park in 1980. The park is reported habitat is of savannah forest and the average elevation varies from 251 to 864m. The park receives an average annual rainfall of 1082 mm. The park is categorized under IUCN II. The painted hunting dog, Lycaon pictus, considered critically endangered by IUCN has a count of 60 within Cameroon and they are reported from this park apart from two other national parks in the country. A total of 23 antelope species occur in the park.

See also
Wildlife of Cameroon
Protected areas of Cameroon
Communes of Cameroon

Notes

References
 C. Michael Hogan. 2009. Painted Hunting Dog: Lycaon pictus, GlobalTwitcher.com, ed. N. Stromberg
 S.N. Stuart, Richard J. Adams, Martin Jenkins. 1990. Biodiversity in sub-Saharan Africa and its islands: conservation, management, and sustainable use, Biodiversity Conservation Strategy Programme, International Union for Conservation of Nature and Natural Resources. Species Survival Commission, Published by IUCN, 242 pages  , 

National parks of Cameroon
North Region (Cameroon)